The Towers of Bologna are a group of medieval structures in Bologna, Italy. The two most prominent ones remaining, known as the Two Towers, are a landmark of the city.

History

Between the 12th and the 13th century, Bologna was a city full of towers. Almost all the towers were tall (the highest being 97m), defensive stone towers. Besides the towers, there are still some fortified gateways (torresotti) that correspond to the gates of the 12th-century city wall (Mura dei torresotti or Cerchia dei Mille), which itself has been almost completely destroyed.

The reasons for the construction of so many towers are not clear. One hypothesis is that the richest families used them for offensive/defensive purposes during the period of the Investiture Controversy.

In the 13th century, many towers were taken down or demolished, and others simply collapsed. Many towers have subsequently been utilized in one way or the other: as prison, city tower, shop or residential building. Still, the towers remained a famous sight of Bologna throughout the later periods; even Dante mentioned some of the towers in his Inferno. The last demolitions took place during the 20th century, according to an ambitious, but retrospectively unfortunate, restructuring plan for the city; the Artenisi Tower and the Riccadonna Tower at the Mercato di mezzo were demolished in 1917.

Fewer than twenty towers can still be seen in today's Bologna. Among the remaining ones are the Azzoguidi Tower, also called Altabella (with a height of 61 m), the Prendiparte Tower, called Coronata (60 m), the Scappi Tower (39 m), Uguzzoni Tower (32 m), Guidozagni Tower, Galluzzi Tower, and the famous Two Towers: the Asinelli Tower (97 m) and the Garisenda Tower (48 m).

Construction
The construction of the towers was quite onerous, the usage of serfs notwithstanding. To build a typical tower with a height of 60 m would have required between three and ten years of work.

Each tower had a square cross-section with foundations between five and ten meters deep, reinforced by poles hammered into the ground and covered with pebble and lime. The tower's base was made of big blocks of selenite stone. The remaining walls became successively thinner and lighter the higher the structure was raised, and were realised in so-called "a sacco" masonry: with a thick inner wall and a thinner outer wall, with the gap being filled with stones and mortar.

Usually, some holes were left in the outer wall as well as bigger hollows in the selenite to support scaffoldings and to allow for later coverings and constructions, generally on the basis of wood.

Number
The towers must actually have crowded Bologna in the Middle Ages and there has been considerable debate about their peak number before the first ones were demolished to avoid collapse or for  other reasons.

The first historian to study the towers of Bologna in a systematic way was Count Giovanni Gozzadini, a senator of the Italian kingdom in the 19th century, who studied the city's history intensively, not least to raise the prestige of his home town in the context of the now united Italy. He based his analysis mostly on the civic archives of real estate deeds, attempting to arrive at a reliable number of towers on the basis of documented ownership changes. His approach resulted in the extraordinary number of 180 towers, an enormous amount considering the size and resources of medieval Bologna.

More recent studies pointed out that Gozzadini's methodology might have led to multiple counts of buildings, which could have been referred to in legal documents by different names, depending on the name of the family who actually owned it at a given moment. More recent estimates reduced therefore the number to a total between 80 and 100, where not all towers existed at the same time.

Two Towers

The most famous pair of towers are located at the intersection of the roads that lead to the five gates of the old ring wall (mura dei torresotti). This was the site of the early medieval Gate to the Via Emilia, the Porta Ravennate, now remembered by the name of the adjacent Piazza di Porta Ravegnana. The taller tower is called the Asinelli while the smaller but more leaning tower is called the Garisenda.

List of the still existing towers and gateways

Towers

 Accursi Tower (Torre Accursi or Torre dell'orologio) - P.zza Maggiore
 Agresti Tower (Torre Agresti) - P.zza Galileo
 Alberici Tower (Torre Alberici) - Via S. Stefano - P.zza della Mercanzia
 Arengo Tower (Torre dell'Arengo) - Piazza Maggiore
 Asinelli Tower (Torre degli Asinelli) - Piazza Ravegnana, 82
 Azzoguidi Tower (Torre Azzoguidi or Torre Altabella) - Via Altabella, 7
 Bertolotti-Clarissimi Tower (Torre Bertolotti-Clarissimi) - Via Farini, 11
 Carrari Tower (Torre Carrari) - Via Marchesana
 Catalani Tower (Torre Catalani) - Vicolo Spirito Santo
 Conoscenti Tower (Torre Conoscenti) - Via Manzoni, 6 (cortile del Museo Civico Medioevale)
 Galluzzi Tower (Torre Galluzzi) - Corte Galluzzi
 Garisenda Tower (Torre Garisenda) - Piazza Ravegnana
 Ghisilieri Tower (Torre Ghisilieri) - Via Nazario Sauro
 Guidozagni Tower (Torre Guidozagni) - Via Albiroli 1-3
 Lambertini Tower (Torre Lambertini) - Piazza Re Enzo
 Lapi Tower (Torre Lapi) - Via IV Novembre
 Oseletti Tower (Torre Oseletti) - Strada Maggiore, 34-36
 Prendiparte Tower (Torre Prendiparte or Torre Coronata) - Via S. Alò, 7
 Scappi Tower (Torre Scappi) - Via Indipendenza, 1
 Toschi Tower (Torre Toschi) - P.zza Minghetti dietro Casa Policardi
 Uguzzoni Tower (Torre Uguzzoni)' - Vicolo Mandria, 1

Gateways
 Castiglione Gateway (Torresotto di Castiglione) - Via Castiglione, 47
 Piella Gateway (Torresotto dei Piella, or Porta Govese or del Mercato) -  Via Piella, via Bertiera
 Porta Nuova Gateway (Torresotto di porta Nuova or del Pratello) -  Via Porta Nuova, via M. Finzi
 San Vitale Gateway (Torresotto di San Vitale) - Via S. Vitale, 56

Descriptions of the Towers by Dante Alighieri

As when one sees the tower called Garisenda 
from underneath its leaning side, and then a cloud 
passes over and it seems to lean the more, 
thus did Antaeus seem to my fixed gaze 
as I watched him bend...
— Divine Comedy, Inferno, XXXI, 136-140

Never can my eyes make amends to me --short 
of going blind-- for their great fault, 
that they gazed at the Garisenda tower 
with its fine view, and --confound them!-- 
missed her, the worthiest of those 
who are talked about. 
— Rime, VIII

See also
 List of tallest structures built before the 20th century
 San Gimignano and Pavia- two other Italian cities where high towers were built in medieval times for family rivalries.

References

Footnotes

External links
Associazione Guglielmo Marconi: Le due Torri
Google Map view of the two towers

 
Tourist attractions in Bologna
Buildings and structures destroyed by arson